San Gabriel, Spanish for Saint Gabriel, may refer to:

North America
Mexico
San Gabriel, Durango
San Gabriel, Guanajuato
San Gabriel, Jalisco
San Gabriel Chilac, Puebla
San Gabriel Mixtepec, Oaxaca

United States
San Gabriel, California
Mission San Gabriel Arcángel in San Gabriel, California
The San Gabriel River (California), site of the 1847 Battle of Rio San Gabriel in the Mexican–American War
The San Gabriel River (Texas), site of the 1839 Battle of the San Gabriels in the Texas-Indian Wars
The San Gabriel Valley in California
The San Gabriel Mountains in California

South & Central America
Ecuador
San Gabriel, Ecuador
Guatemala
San Gabriel, Suchitepéquez

Other
Philippines
San Gabriel, La Union

See also
 Saint Gabriel (disambiguation)